Mycobacterium cookii is a species of the phylum Actinomycetota (Gram-positive bacteria with high guanine and cytosine content, one of the dominant phyla of all bacteria), belonging to the genus Mycobacterium.

Description
Gram-positive, nonmotile and polymorphic acid-fast rods (0.8 µm x 1.4–1.9 µm). Forms clumps, but not cords or cross bands. Does not form spores, capsules and aerial hyphae.

Colony characteristics
Colonies are smooth and glistening with yellow-orange pigmentation (0.5–1.0 mm diameter, scotochromogenic).

Physiology
Slow growth on Löwenstein-Jensen medium or Middlebrook 7H10 agar at 31 °C (optimal temperature). No growth at 37 °C, 42 °C or 45 °C.
Most of the strains are susceptible to ethambutol, isoniazid, streptomycin, and rifampin.

Differential characteristics
Phylogenetic position between the slowly growing pathogenic species and the saprotrophic rapidly growing species by partial 16S rDNA sequencing.

Pathogenesis
Not pathogenic for humans, mice, guinea pigs and rabbits.  Biosafety level 1.
Provokes a non-specific hypersensitivity reaction to bovine tuberculin.

Type strain
Strain NZ2 = ATCC 49103 = CIP 105396 = DSM 43922 = JCM 12404.

References

Kazda et al. 1990.  Mycobacterium cookii sp. nov. Int. J. Syst. Bacteriol.,40, 217–223.

External links
Type strain of Mycobacterium cookii at BacDive -  the Bacterial Diversity Metadatabase

Acid-fast bacilli
cookii
Bacteria described in 1990